Private Thomas Burke (1842 to March 15, 1902) was an Irish soldier who fought in the American Civil War. Burke received the United States' highest award for bravery during combat, the Medal of Honor, for his action at Hanover, Pennsylvania on June 30, 1863. He was honored with the award on February 11, 1878.

Biography
Burke was born in Ireland in 1842. He joined the 5th New York Cavalry in October 1861, and mustered out in October 1864. Burke died on 15 March 1902 and his remains are interred at the Calvary Cemetery in New York.

Medal of Honor citation

See also

List of Medal of Honor recipients for the Battle of Gettysburg
List of American Civil War Medal of Honor recipients: A–F

References

1842 births
1902 deaths
Irish-born Medal of Honor recipients
People of New York (state) in the American Civil War
Union Army officers
United States Army Medal of Honor recipients
American Civil War recipients of the Medal of Honor